Eleonore of Fürstenberg (11 October 1523 – 23 June 1544 in Bouxwiller) was a daughter of Count Frederick III of Fürstenberg.  Eleanore was a convinced Protestant.  However, she had little influence on the change of denomination in Hanau-Lichtenberg, due to her untimely death.

On 22 August 1538 in Heiligenberg, she married Count Philip IV of Hanau-Lichtenberg.  They had the following children:
 Amalie (23 February 1540 in Bouxwiller – 1 May 1540)
 Philip V (21 February 1541, Bouxwiller, – 1599)
 Anna Sibylle (16 May 1542 – after 1590), married to Louis of Fleckenstein-Dagstuhl
 Johanna (23 May 1543 in Bouxwiller; – 5 December 1599 in Babenhausen, buried there), married to Wolfgang of Isenburg-Büdingen-Ronneburg, divorced in 1573
 Eleanor (26 April 1544 in Bouxwiller; – 6 January 1585), married to Albert of Hohenlohe

She died in childbirth in 1544, only 21 years old, and was buried in the Abbey of St. Adelphi in Neuwiller-lès-Saverne.

Ancestors

References 
 M. Goltzené: Aus der Geschichte des Amtes Buchsweiler, in: Pay d’Alsace, issue 111/112, p. 67.
 Reinhard Suchier: Genealogie des Hanauer Grafenhauses, in: Festschrift des Hanauer Geschichtsvereins zu seiner fünfzigjährigen Jubelfeier am 27. August 1894, Hanau, 1894
Ernst J. Zimmermann: Hanau Stadt und Land, 3rd ed., Hanau, 1919, reprinted 1978

Footnotes 

Deaths in childbirth
German Protestants
German countesses
1523 births
1544 deaths
16th-century German people
Fürstenberg (princely family)
House of Hanau